Abdul Khaliq (5 November 1896 – 24 August 1943) was an Indian cricketer, who played for 19 first-class cricket matches for Sind, Western India, Karachi and Western India States between 1933 and 1942. He became Sheikh Sahib of Mangrol in 1941.

Abdul Khaliq appeared in two matches for Western India in 1941 alongside his son Shaikh Nasiruddin.

References

External links
player profile

Indian cricketers
1896 births
1943 deaths